{{Infobox Airport
| name         = Abernathy Field
| image        = Abernathy Field.JPG
| IATA         = 
| ICAO         = KGZS
| FAA          = GZS
| type         = Public
| owner        = City of Pulaski & Giles County
| operator     = 
| city-served  = Pulaski, Tennessee
| location     = 
| elevation-f  = 685
| elevation-m  = 209
| coordinates  = 
| website      = 
| pushpin_map            = USA Tennessee
| pushpin_mapsize        = 200
| pushpin_map_caption    = Location of airport in Tennessee
| pushpin_label          = KGZS| pushpin_label_position = right
| r1-number    = 16/34
| r1-length-f  = 5,001
| r1-length-m  = 1,524
| r1-surface   = Asphalt
| stat-year    = 2009
| stat1-header = Aircraft operations
| stat1-data   = 8,200
| stat2-header = Based aircraft
| stat2-data   = 11
| footnotes    = Source: Federal Aviation Administration
}}Abernathy Field  is a public use airport located three nautical miles (6 km) southwest of the central business district of Pulaski, a city in Giles County, Tennessee, United States. It is owned by the City of Pulaski and Giles County. According to the FAA's National Plan of Integrated Airport Systems for 2009–2013, it is categorized as a general aviation facility.

Although many U.S. airports use the same three-letter location identifier for the FAA and IATA, this facility is assigned GZS''' by the FAA but has no designation from the IATA.

 Facilities and aircraft 
It has one runway designated 16/34 with an asphalt surface measuring 5,001 by 75 feet (1,524 x 23 m).

For the 12-month period ending June 3, 2009, the airport had 8,200 aircraft operations, an average of 22 per day: 98% general aviation, 1% air taxi, and 1% military.
At that time there were 11 aircraft based at this airport: 9 single-engine, 1 multi-engine, and 1 jet.

 References 

 External links 
 Aerial image as of 1 April 1998 from USGS The National Map''
 Abernathy Field (GZS) at Tennessee DOT airport directory
 
 

Airports in Tennessee
Buildings and structures in Giles County, Tennessee
Transportation in Giles County, Tennessee